PO Nel (17 April 1877 –  23 July 1928) was a South African international rugby union player who played as a forward.

He made 3 appearances for South Africa in 1903.

References

South African rugby union players
South Africa international rugby union players
1877 births
1928 deaths
Rugby union forwards